German submarine U-907 was a Type VIIC U-boat of Nazi Germany's Kriegsmarine during World War II.

She was ordered on 6 August 1942, and was laid down on 1 April 1943 at H. C. Stülcken Sohn, Hamburg, as yard number 804. She was launched on 1 March 1944 and commissioned under the command of Oberleutnant zur See Servais Cabolet on 18 May 1944.

Design
German Type VIIC submarines were preceded by the shorter Type VIIB submarines. U-907 had a displacement of  when at the surface and  while submerged. She had two shafts and two  propellers.

U-907 was fitted with five  torpedo tubes (four fitted at the bow and one at the stern), fourteen torpedoes or 26 TMA mines, one  SK C/35 naval gun, (220 rounds), one  Flak M42 and two twin  C/30 anti-aircraft guns. The boat had a complement of between 44 — 52 men.

Service history
On 9 May 1945, U-907 surrendered at Bergen, Norway. She was later transferred to Loch Ryan, Scotland on 2 June 1945. Of the 156 U-boats that eventually surrendered to the Allied forces at the end of the war, U-907 was one of 116 selected to take part in Operation Deadlight. U-907 was towed out on 7 December 1945, and sunk.

References

Bibliography

External links

German Type VIIC submarines
U-boats commissioned in 1944
World War II submarines of Germany
Ships built in Hamburg
1944 ships
Maritime incidents in December 1945
World War II shipwrecks in the Atlantic Ocean
Operation Deadlight